This is a list of recognized higher education related accreditation organizations. The list includes agencies and organizations that play a role in higher education accreditation and are recognized by the appropriate governmental authorities.

International
The International Network for Quality Assurance Agencies in Higher Education (INQAAHE) is a global association of quality assurance organizations, both governmental and non-governmental. It 
was founded in 1991 with 8 member organizations and now has over 280. It defines its role as "to promote and advance excellence in higher education through the support of an active international community of quality assurance agencies". Its membership list is available online.

The United States-based Council for Higher Education Accreditation (CHEA) (a non-governmental organization) maintains an International Directory which "contains contact information about 467 quality assurance bodies, accreditation bodies and Ministries of Education in 175 countries. The quality assurance and accreditation bodies have been authorized to operate by their respective governments either as agencies of the government or as private (nongovernmental) organizations."

Europe
The European Association for Quality Assurance in Higher Education (ENQA) disseminates information, experiences and good practices in the field of quality assurance (QA) in higher education to QA agencies, public authorities and higher education institutions in the European Higher Education Area. It is a membership organization, comprising 51 agencies in 28 countries, and was established in 2000 following a recommendation from the Council of the European Union in 1998.

The European Quality Assurance Register for Higher Education (EQAR) was established by ENQA, the European Students' Union (ESI), the European University Association (EUA) and the European Association of Institutions in Higher Education (EURASHE) – the European representative bodies of quality assurance agencies, students, universities and other higher education institutions – to increase the transparency of quality assurance in higher education across Europe. EQAR publishes and manages a register of quality assurance agencies that substantially comply with the European Standards and Guidelines for Quality Assurance (ESG) to provide the public with clear and reliable information on quality assurance agencies operating in Europe. The register is web-based and freely accessible.

ENIC – NARIC comprises all countries of Europe (including the Holy See and thus all Pontifical Universities worldwide) as well as Australia, Canada, Israel, the United States of America and New Zealand. The website also provides information on the higher education systems of the member countries and the accreditation agencies

To implement the Lisbon Recognition Convention and, in general, to develop policy and practice for the recognition of qualifications, the Council of Europe and UNESCO have established the ENIC Network (European Network of National Information Centres on academic recognition and mobility). The Council of Europe and UNESCO/CEPES jointly provide the Secretariat for the ENIC Network. The ENIC Network cooperates closely with the NARIC Network of the European Union.
The Network is made up of the national information centres of the States party to the European Cultural Convention or the UNESCO Europe Region. An ENIC is a body set up by the national authorities. While the size and specific competence of ENIC may vary, they will generally provide information on: – the recognition of foreign diplomas, degrees and other qualifications; – education systems in both foreign countries and the ENIC's own country; – opportunities for studying abroad, including information on loans and scholarships, as well as advice on practical questions related to mobility and equivalence.

The NARIC  (National Academic Recognition Information Centre) network is an initiative of the European Commission and was created in 1984. The network aims at improving academic recognition of diplomas and periods of study in the Member States of the European Union (EU) countries, the European Economic Area (EEA) countries and Turkey. The network is part of the Community's Lifelong Learning Programme (LLP), which stimulates the mobility of students and staff between higher education institutions in these countries.
All member countries have designated national centres, the purpose of which is to assist in promoting the mobility of students, teachers and researchers by providing authoritative advice and information concerning the academic recognition of diplomas and periods of study undertaken in other States. The main users of this service are higher education institutions, students and their advisers, parents, teachers and prospective employers.
The NARICs were designated by the Ministries of Education in the respective countries, but the status and the scope of work of individual NARICs may differ. In the majority of States, institutions of higher education are autonomous, taking their own decisions on the admission of foreign students and the exemption of parts of courses of study programmes that students may be granted on the basis of education undertaken abroad. As a result, most NARICs do not take a decision, but offer on request information and advice on foreign education systems and qualifications.

Czech Republic
There are public, state and private universities and colleges in the Czech Republic. Their list is maintained by the Ministry of Education, Youth and Sports of the Czech Republic. Public universities and colleges are established by Acts of Parliament. There are two state universities, namely the University of Defence in Brno and the Police Academy of the Czech Republic  in Prague, also established by an Act of Parliament. Private universities and colleges are established by the private sector. Each of the universities and colleges can provide higher education (bachelor's, master's or doctoral) only on the basis of accreditation issued by the National Accreditation Bureau for Higher Education. There are professional education programmes standing outside the higher education system, i.e. MBA, LLM, which are not considered as higher education programmes. The schools and institutions providing them may be umbrellaed by some private organisations, e.g. CAMBAS (Czech Association of MBA Schools).

Finland
Universities may be founded or accredited only by an Act of Parliament. Vocational universities may be accredited by the Government of Finland, and governed through the Ministry of Education.

Germany
The Standing Conference of the Ministers of Education and Cultural Affairs of the Länder in the Federal Republic of Germany (Kultusministerkonferenz or KMK) was founded in 1948 by an agreement between the states of the Federal Republic of Germany.  Among its core responsibilities, the KMK ensures quality development and continuity in tertiary education.  Bachelor and Master programs must be accredited in accordance to a resolution of the Kultusministerkonerenz.

The German Council of Science and Humanities (Wissenschaftsrat) was founded on September 5, 1957, and conducts institutional accreditation of private and religious universities since 2001.

The Foundation for the Accreditation of Study Programs in Germany or Accreditation Council (Akkreditierungsrat) was created in a KMK resolution on October 15, 2004.  The Accreditation Council certifies accreditation agencies and establishes guidelines and criteria for program and system accreditation. There are currently ten certified agencies.

AHPGS – Accreditation Agency for Study Programs in Special Education, Care, Health Sciences and Social Work
AKAST – Agency for Quality Assurance and Accreditation of Canonical Study Programs
ACQUIN – Accreditation, Certification and Quality Assurance Institute
AQAS – Agency for Quality Assurance by Accreditation of Study Programs
AQ Austria – Agency for Quality Assurance and Accreditation Austria
ASIIN – Accreditation Agency for Degree Programs in Engineering, Informatics/Computer Science, the Natural Sciences and Mathematics
evalag – Evaluation Agency Baden-Württemberg
FIBAA – Foundation for International Business Administration Accreditation
OAQ – Swiss Center of Accreditation and Quality Assurance in Higher Education
ZEvA – Central Evaluation- and Accreditation Agency

These agencies accredit programs of study for Bachelor and master's degrees and quality management systems (system accreditation) from state or state recognized Higher Education institutions in Germany and abroad. AKAST only accredit programs of study.

Ireland
Quality and Qualifications Ireland was established in 2012 as the single agency responsible for external quality assurance of higher education institutions in Ireland, replacing predecessor agencies responsible for different sectors of higher education. It is responsible for the quality assurance of education and research within HEIs.  Higher education institutions have been subject to statutory quality assurance since the 1990s and the country has been an active participant in the development of the European model of quality assurance.

Italy
Since at least 1933 ( "R.D. 31 agosto 1933, n. 1592.", Law of higher education), the Italian state controls the use of the name "Universita" for an institution. This law, and successive modifications, report a list on university, schools, budget and human resources for each university. Table D, and successive modifications, reports the exact number of lecturers for each university and school. The universities were under the control of government and Parlament, e.g. all new lecturerships must be established by law. The Law "8 marzo 1999,  n. 50" (called Bassanini Quater) delegate to the Minister of University and Investigation the supervision of universities. The system involves two separate but correlated programs that were instituted at the same time: First, each university went through a four-step process to adopt and approve its own Regolamenti Didattici di Ateneo (RDA). The RDA establishes the rules for the organization of teaching at the university, including establishing the requirements and objectives of each degree program, the curricula, credits awarded and requirements and objectives of examinations. The RDA's were developed in consultation with representatives of the individual university, the regional coordinating committee (CRC), employers and the National University Council and are ultimately approved by the Ministry of Education (MIUR). Second, a series of formal, objective standards was adopted as minimum requirements for approval of any programs.

Spain
In Spain, ANECA or Agencia Nacional de la Evaluación de la Calidad y Acreditación (National Agency for Quality Assessment and Accreditation) is the authorised national body responsible for the quality of the Spanish high education system. It was created as a foundation in 2002 by the Cabinet of Spain under the Organic Law of Universities. Different regional agencies assume the accreditation (and quality levels) of university programs in their respective regions:

 ACPUA, in Aragon
 ACSUCYL, in Castile and Leon
 ACSUG, in Galicia
 AQU, in Catalonia
 AVAP, in Valencian Community
 DEVA-AAC, in Andalusia
 FCM Madrimasd, in Community of Madrid
 Unibasq, in Basque Country

United Kingdom
Under the Education Reform Act 1988 it is illegal to offer a degree or qualification that implies it is a degree, unless the institution offering it is authorised by a royal charter or by or under an Act of Parliament, or is acting on behalf of an institution so authorised, or the award has been specifically designated by order of the Secretary of State. The government maintains lists of "recognised bodies" that have the right to grant UK degrees, and of "listed bodies" that offer courses validated by a recognised body and leading to degrees of that body. UK institutions offering courses leading to degrees are subject to quality assurance by the Quality Assurance Agency (QAA). The QAA is a member of INQAAHE and ENQA. Higher Education Degree Datacheck is the official service for validating British degrees and authenticating universities.

Professional degrees may be accredited by professional, statutory and regulatory bodies to ensure they meet the educational standards for professional licensure; a list of accrediting bodies recognised by the government is maintained by the Higher Education Statistics Agency.

For non-degree qualifications, including courses at the higher education level, there are four public accrediting bodies for the four countries of the United Kingdom. These are:
 Ofqual in England
 Qualifications Wales
 The Council for the Curriculum, Examinations & Assessment in Northern Ireland
 The Scottish Qualifications Authority
All qualifications accredited by these bodies will have a level and a credit value on the Regulated Qualifications Framework (England and Northern Ireland), the Credit and Qualifications Framework for Wales, or the Scottish Credit and Qualifications Framework. Bodies with accredited qualifications, such as City & Guilds, may themselves accredit education providers to deliver courses leading to these qualifications.

There are, additionally, four bodies offering institutional accreditation for private colleges that are recognized by the UK government for visa purposes:
 The Accreditation Service for International Colleges (ASIC) for independent colleges in UK and colleges and universities worldwide. ASIC is an affiliate of ENQA.
 The British Accreditation Council (BAC) for independent higher education and further education institutions across the UK. BAC is also a member of INQAAHE and ENQA.
 Accreditation UK, part of the British Council (a non-departmental public body sponsored by the Foreign and Commonwealth Office), for English language schools only
 The Accreditation Body for Language Services (ABLS) for English language schools

Additionally, the Open and Distance Learning Quality Council (ODLQC) was established by the government in 1969 as the Council for the Accreditation of Correspondence Colleges and took its current name in 1995. It is now an independent body that accredits home study, distance learning and online learning providers.

Switzerland
In Switzerland, there is still no national accreditation for private universities

Ghana
The Independent Security Council (ISC), Ghana Medical Association (GMA), Pharmacy Council, and General Legal Council (GLC) are the most notable and recognised professional bodies in Ghana. Though the GMA and GLC may effectively represent the government of Ghana, the Independent Security Council is the official non-governmental Body established with the mandate to provide security training; award and accredit security programs. Unlike the GMA and GLC, the Independent Security Council academically partner with universities with security-focused departments with the aim of offering such universities courses to local citizens.

Other government recognised professional Bodies like Council for Technical and Vocational Education and Training (COTVET), Engineering Council of Ghana, National Board for Professional and Technician Examination, and National Council for Tertiary Education are mandated with level of regulatory status in specific fields of respective practices.

Hong Kong
In Hong Kong, the Hong Kong Council for Accreditation of Academic and Vocational Qualifications (HKCAAVQ) conducts accreditation under an ordinance that took effect on 1 October 2007. The former Hong Kong Council for Academic Accreditation was replaced by this new authority. The HKCAAVQ maintains a list of accredited programs and programs accredited by the HKCAAVQ also may be entered into Hong Kong's Qualifications Register.
 The Law Society of Hong Kong
 Hong Kong Bar Association
 The Medical Council of Hong Kong
 Hong Kong Council for Accreditation of Academic and Vocational Qualifications

India
Universities in India are created constitutionally, through government action. Institutions "which are not established under either
Central or State or UGC Act" are labeled "fake universities/vishwavidyalayas" and lack authority to grant degrees.

Recognition or accreditation of courses of study is under the authority of a set of professional councils established by statute and other autonomous coordinative or regulatory bodies established or recognized by the University Grants Commission:
 National Board of Accreditation (NBA)
 Quality Council of India (QCI)
 Distance Education Council (DEC)
 National Council for Teacher Education (NCTE)
 Indian Council of Agricultural Research (ICAR)
 Bar Council of India (BCI)
 Scientific Institute and Research Organizations (SIROs)
 National Council for Teacher Education (NCTE)
 Rehabilitation Council of India (RCI)
 Medical Council of India (MCI)
 Pharmacy Council Of India (PCI)
 Indian Nursing Council (INC)
 Aiipphs State Government University Delhi (ADU)
 National Council for Indian Education (NCIE)
 Dental Council of India (DCI)
 Central Council of Homoeopathy (CCH)
 Central Council of Indian Medicine (CCIM)
 National Assessment and Accreditation Council (NAAC)
 Ministry of Human Resource Development (MHRD)
 Association of Indian Universities (AIU)
 Indian Maritime University(IMU)
 Indira Gandhi National Open University (IGNOU)

Indonesia
In Indonesia according to Law Number 12 of 2012 concerning Higher Education Article 55, accreditation is an assessment activity in accordance with the criteria that have been set based on the National Higher Education Standards. The accreditation is carried out to determine the feasibility of Study Programs and Higher Education on the basis of criteria that refer to the National Higher Education Standards.

Accreditation for Higher Education Institutions is carried out by the Badan Akreditasi Nasional Perguruan Tinggi (BAN-PT) or in English National Accreditation Board for Higher Education. Meanwhile, accreditation for study programs is carried out by the Lembaga Akreditasi Mandiri (LAM) or in English Independent Accreditation Institute. However, before the establishment of an independent accreditation agency for a knowledge cluster, accreditation of study programs will still be carried out by BAN-PT.

1. LAM Sains Alam dan Ilmu Formal (LAMSAMA) concerning Natural and Formal Sciences
2. LAM Pendidikan Tinggi Kesehatan (LAM PT-Kes) concerning Health education
3. LAM Teknik concerning Engineering education
4. LAM Kependidikan concerning Teacher education
5. LAM Ekonomi, Manajemen, Bisnis, dan Akuntansi (LAM EMBA) concerning Economics, Management, Business, and Accounting education
6. LAM Informatika dan Komputer (LAM INFOKOM) concerning Informatics and Computing education

Other than these national LAM, there's also Indonesian Accreditation Board for Engineering (IABEE) as a member of the Washington accord and Seoul accord. Thus it grants international accreditation for Engineering, and Informatics and Computing education.

Malaysia
In Malaysia, the Malaysian Qualifications Agency (MQA) is a statutory body to accredit academic programs provided by educational institutions providing post secondary or higher education and facilitate the accreditation and articulation of qualifications.

There are also some other recognized organizations who regulate their specific technical fields, which includes:
 Board of Engineers Malaysia (BEM)
 Malaysian Medical Council (MMC)
 Malaysian Dental Council (MDC)
 Pharmacy Board Malaysia
 Malaysian Chinese Medical Associations (MCMA)
 Federation of Chinese Physicians and Acupuncturists Associations Malaysia (FCPAAM)
 Malaysia Nursing Board
 Malaysian Veterinary Council (MVC)
 Malaysian Homeopathic Medical Council (MPHM)
 Board of Architects Malaysia (LAM)
 Board of Quantity Surveyors Malaysia (BQSM)
 Malaysian Bar Council
 Malaysian Institute of Accountants (MIA)
 Chartered Tax Institute of Malaysia (CTIM)
 Financial Planning Association of Malaysia (FPAM)
 Asian Institute of Chartered Bankers (AICB)
 Malaysian Association of Company Secretaries (MACS)
 The Malaysian Institute of Chartered Secretaries and Administrators (MAICSA)
 Board of Valuers, Appraisers & Real Estate Agents Malaysia (LPPEH)
 The Society of Logisticians, Malaysia

Nepal
Universities in Nepal are established through government action. Four current universities, Four being established universities and Three other technical institutes are recognized by the government body "University grants commission" There are almost 1435 colleges in all over 77 districts in Nepal. The current status of the Quality Assurance & Accredited (QAA) certified higher education institution is 20 college. 
 Balkumari College, Chitwan
 Damak Multiple Campus, Jhapa
 Siddhanath Multiple Campus, Kanchanpur
 Lumbini Banijya Campus, Rupandehi
 Kailali Multiple Campus, Kailali
 Makawanpur Multiple Campus, Makawanpur
 Janapriya Multiple Campus, Kaski
 Kathmandu University School of Science
 Kathmandu University School of Engineering
 Sahid Smriti Multiple Campus, Chitwan
 Aadikavi Bhanubhakta Campus, Tanahun
 Tikapur Multiple Campus, Kailali
 Mahendra Ratna Multiple Campus, Illam
 Sukuna Multiple Campus, Morang
 Sindhuli Multiple Campus, Sindhuli
 College of Biomedical Engineering and Applied Sciences, Kathmandu
 Madhyabindu Multiple Campus, Nawalparasi
 Saptagandaki Multiple Campus, Chitwan
 Mahakabi Devkota Campus, Nawalparasi
 Rupandehi Campus, Rupandehi

University Grants Commission (UGC) has circulated a notice to all other colleges to start the process by Mangsir 2079 B.S.

The National Education Policy – 2076 (clause 10. 14) envisions University & Higher Education Council in the chairmanship of Honorable Prime Minister to regulate and supervise higher education policies, universities, and University Grant Commission (UGC). 
 The policy clearly outlines some mandatory requirements such as Quality Assurance & Accreditation (QAA) & Education Management Information System (EMIS) for every higher education institution. The policy statements below testify the intensity and direction of the Government of Nepal for higher education institutions.
 Colleges / Universities with lower student enrollment will be merged and human resources of the merged institution will be managed accordingly. (Policy Clause – 10.14.10)
 To ensure quality assurance, a national quality prototype will be prepared and quality measurement will be done through an independent quality assessment mechanism under the Higher Education Commission. Higher education institutions that fail to ensure quality standard as per the given criteria within the specified time period will be closed. (Policy Clause – 10.49.2)
 The quality of educational institutions and agencies providing higher education will be assessed in every five-years interval. (Policy Clause – 10.49.4)
  

Other than that, the Council For Technical Education and Vocational Training (CTEVT), established in 1989, by the Government of Nepal is the national autonomous apex body of Technical and Vocational Education and Training regulation. There are also some other recognized organizations who regulate their specific technical fields. They are:
 Nepal Engineering Council
 Nepal Nursing Council
 Nepal Medical Council
 Nepal Pharmacy Council
 Nepal Bar Council

New Zealand
The New Zealand Qualifications Authority (NZQA).

Nicaragua
A university in Nicaragua (public or private) can only be established with evaluation and approval (authorisation) by the National Council of Universities (CNU Consejo Nacional de Universidades) as precursor to being founded by Act of Parliament. Such recognised universities enjoy the full Anglo-Saxon-style autonomy and require no programme accreditations. The National Council of Evaluation and Accreditation (CNEA) is the quality assurance agency. All recognised universities must participate in the quality assurance programme including mandatory auto-evaluation and reporting to CNEA, and may pursue deliberate institutional accreditation by CNEA or an accreditation agency recognised by CNEA. However, CNEA accreditation does only apply to already recognised universities and does not substitute the required CNU authorisation (first accreditation).

Pakistan
In 2003, Canada began helping Pakistan develop an accreditation system. As stated in "Ordinance No. LIII of 2002, Para 10, Clause e", the Higher Education Commission (HEC) may set up national or regional evaluation councils or authorize any existing council or similar body to carry out accreditation of institutions including their departments, facilities and disciplines by giving them appropriate ratings.
 Established under Quality Assurance Agency of HEC
 National Accreditation Council for Teachers Education (NACTE)
 National Agricultural Education Accreditation Council (NAEAC)
 National Business Education Accreditation Council (NBEAC)
 National Computing Education Accreditation Council (NCEAC)
 National Technology Council (Pakistan)
 HEC independent professional bodies
 Pakistan Bar Council (PBC)
 Pakistan Council for Architects and Town Planners (PCATP)
 Pharmacy Council of Pakistan (PCP)
 Pakistan Engineering Council (PEC)
 Pakistan Medical and Dental Council (PMDC)
 Pakistan Nursing Council (PNC)
 Pakistan Veterinary Medical Council (PVMC)
 National Council for Homeopathy (NCH)
 National Council for Tibb (NCT)

United Arab Emirates
 Commission for Academic Accreditation (CAA)

United States

Institutional accreditation
Institutional accreditation applies to the entire institution, specific programs, and distance education within an institution. The U.S. Department of Education recognizes the following organizations as institutional accreditors:

 Academy of Nutrition and Dietetics, Accreditation Council for Education in Nutrition and Dietetics
 Accrediting Bureau of Health Education Schools
 Accreditation Commission for Acupuncture and Oriental Medicine
 Accreditation Commission for Education in Nursing
 Accrediting Commission of Career Schools and Colleges
 Accrediting Council for Continuing Education and Training
 American Bar Association
 American Board of Funeral Service Education
 American Osteopathic Association
 American Podiatric Medical Association
 Association for Biblical Higher Education
 Association of Advanced Rabbinical and Talmudic Schools
 Association of Institutions of Jewish Studies
 Association of Theological Schools
 Commission on Massage Therapy Accreditation
 Council on Accreditation of Nurse Anesthesia Educational Programs
 Council on Chiropractic Education
 Council on Occupational Education
 Distance Education Accrediting Commission
 Higher Learning Commission
 Joint Review Committee on Education in Radiologic Technology
 Middle States Commission on Higher Education
 Middle States Commission on Secondary Schools
 Midwifery Education Accreditation Council
 Montessori Accreditation Council for Teacher Education
 National Accrediting Commission of Career Arts and Sciences
 National Association of Schools of Art and Design
 National Association of Schools of Dance
 National Association of Schools of Music
 National Association of Schools of Theatre
 New England Commission of Higher Education
 New York State Board of Regents, and the Commissioner of Education
 Northwest Commission on Colleges and Universities
 Southern Association of Colleges and Schools
 Transnational Association of Christian Colleges and Schools
 WASC Accrediting Commission for Community and Junior Colleges
 WASC Senior College and University Commission

Programmatic accreditation
These accreditors typically cover a specific program of professional education or training, but in some cases they cover the whole institution. Both the US Department of Education and CHEA maintain lists of recognized US programmatic accreditors:

 Accreditation Commission for Acupuncture and Oriental Medicine (ACAOM) (Not CHEA-recognized, USDE-recognized)
 Accreditation Commission for Audiology Education (ACAE) (CHEA-recognized, not USDE-recognized)
 Accreditation Commission for Education in Nursing (ACEN) (CHEA-recognized, USDE-recognized)
 Accreditation Commission for Midwifery Education (ACME) (Not CHEA-recognized, USDE-recognized although not eligible for Title IV funding)
 Accreditation Council for Business Schools and Programs (ACBSP) (CHEA-recognized, not USDE-recognized)
 Accreditation Council for Education in Nutrition and Dietetics, Academy of Nutrition and Dietetics (ACEND) (Not CHEA-recognized, USDE-recognized)
 Accreditation Council for Pharmacy Education (ACPE) (CHEA-recognized, USDE-recognized although not eligible for Title IV funding)
 Accreditation Council on Optometric Education (ACOE) (CHEA-recognized, USDE-recognized although not eligible for Title IV funding)
 Accreditation Review Commission on Education for the Physician Assistant (ARC-PA) (CHEA-recognized, not USDE-recognized)
 Accrediting Bureau of Health Education Schools (ABHES) (Not CHEA-recognized, USDE-recognized)
 Accrediting Council on Education in Journalism and Mass Communications (ACEJMC) (CHEA-recognized, not USDE-recognized)
 American Academy of Forensic Sciences Forensic Science Education Programs Accreditation Commission (AAFS-FEPAC) (CHEA-recognized, not USDE-recognized)
 American Association of Family and Consumer Sciences, Council for Accreditation (AAFCS-CFA) (CHEA-recognized, not USDE-recognized)
 American Board of Funeral Service Education, Committee on Accreditation (ABFSE) (CHEA-recognized, USDE-recognized)
 American Council for Construction Education (ACCE) (CHEA-recognized, not USDE-recognized)
 American Culinary Federation Education Foundation, Accrediting Commission (ACFEF-AC) (CHEA-recognized, not USDE-recognized)
 American Library Association, Committee on Accreditation (ALA-CoA) (CHEA-recognized, not USDE-recognized)
 American Occupational Therapy Association, Accreditation Council for Occupational Therapy Education (AOTA-ACOTE) (CHEA-recognized, USDE-recognized although not eligible for Title IV funding)
 American Osteopathic Association, Commission on Osteopathic College Accreditation (AOA-COCA) (Not CHEA-recognized, USDE-recognized)
 American Physical Therapy Association, Commission on Accreditation in Physical Therapy Education (APTA-CAPTE) (CHEA-recognized, USDE-recognized although not eligible for Title IV funding)
 American Podiatric Medical Association, Council on Podiatric Medical Education (APMA-CPME) (CHEA-recognized, USDE-recognized)
 American Psychological Association, Commission on Accreditation (APA-CoA) (CHEA-recognized, USDE-recognized although not eligible for Title IV funding)
 American Veterinary Medical Association, Council on Education (AVMA-COE) (CHEA-recognized, USDE-recognized although not eligible for Title IV funding)
 Association for Advancing Quality in Educator Preparation (AAQEP) (CHEA-recognized, not USDE-recognized)
 Association for Behavior Analysis International Accreditation Board (ABAI) (CHEA-recognized, not USDE-recognized)
 Association for Biblical Higher Education Commission on Accreditation (ABHE) (CHEA-recognized, USDE-recognized)
 Association for Clinical Pastoral Education, Accreditation Commission (ACPE Inc) (Not CHEA-recognized, USDE-recognized although not eligible for Title IV funding)
 Association of Technology, Management, and Applied Engineering (ATMAE) (CHEA-recognized, not USDE-recognized)
 Aviation Accreditation Board International (AABI) (CHEA-recognized, not USDE-recognized)
 Commission on Accreditation for Health Informatics and Information Management Education (CAHIIM) (CHEA-recognized, not USDE-recognized)
 Commission on Accreditation for Marriage and Family Therapy Education, American Association for Marriage and Family Therapy (COAMFTE-AAMFT) (CHEA-recognized, not USDE-recognized)
 Commission on Accreditation for Respiratory Care (CoARC) (CHEA-recognized, not USDE-recognized)
 Commission on Accreditation of Allied Health Education Programs (CAAHEP) (CHEA-recognized, not USDE-recognized)
 Commission on Accreditation of Athletic Training Education (CAATE) (CHEA-recognized, not USDE-recognized)
 Commission on Accreditation of Healthcare Management Education (CAHME) (CHEA-recognized, not USDE-recognized)
 Commission on Accreditation of Medical Physics Education Programs (CAMPEP) (CHEA-recognized, not USDE-recognized)
 Commission on Collegiate Nursing Education (CCNE) (Not CHEA-recognized, USDE-recognized although not eligible for Title IV funding)
 Commission on Dental Accreditation, American Dental Association (CODA) (Not CHEA-recognized, USDE-recognized although not eligible for Title IV funding)
 Commission on English Language Program Accreditation (CEA) (Not CHEA-recognized, USDE-recognized although not eligible for Title IV funding)
 Commission on Massage Therapy Accreditation (COMTA) (Not CHEA-recognized, USDE-recognized)
 Commission on Opticianry Accreditation (COA-OP) (CHEA-recognized, not USDE-recognized)
 Commission on Sport Management Accreditation (COSMA) (CHEA-recognized, not USDE-recognized)
 Council for Accreditation of Counseling and Related Educational Programs (CACREP) (CHEA-recognized, not USDE-recognized)
 Council for Interior Design Accreditation (CIDA) (CHEA-recognized, not USDE-recognized)
 Council for Standards in Human Service Education (CSHSE) (CHEA-recognized, not USDE-recognized)
 Council for the Accreditation of Educator Preparation (CAEP) (CHEA-recognized, not USDE-recognized)
 Council of the Section of Legal Education and Admissions to the Bar, American Bar Association (ABA) (Not CHEA-recognized, USDE-recognized)
 Council on Academic Accreditation in Audiology and Speech-Language Pathology, American Speech-Language-Hearing Association (CAA-ASHA) (CHEA-recognized, USDE-recognized although not eligible for Title IV funding)
 Council on Accreditation of Nurse Anesthesia Educational Programs (COA) (CHEA-recognized, USDE-recognized)
 Council on Accreditation of Parks, Recreation, Tourism and Related Professions (COAPRT) (CHEA-recognized, not USDE-recognized)
 Council on Chiropractic Education (CCE) (CHEA-recognized, USDE-recognized)
 Council on Education for Public Health (CEPH) (Not CHEA-recognized, USDE-recognized although not eligible for Title IV funding)
 Council on Naturopathic Medical Education (CNME) (Not CHEA-recognized, USDE-recognized although not eligible for Title IV funding)
 Council on Social Work Education, Commission on Accreditation (CSWE-COA) (CHEA-recognized, not USDE-recognized)
 International Accreditation Council for Business Education (IACBE) (CHEA-recognized, not USDE-recognized)
 International Fire Service Accreditation Congress - Degree Assembly (IFSAC-DA) (CHEA-recognized, not USDE-recognized)
 Joint Review Committee on Education in Radiologic Technology (JRCERT) (CHEA-recognized, USDE-recognized)
 Joint Review Committee on Educational Programs in Nuclear Medicine Technology (JRCNMT) (CHEA-recognized, not USDE-recognized)
 Landscape Architectural Accreditation Board, American Society of Landscape Architects (LAAB-ASLA) (CHEA-recognized, not USDE-recognized)
 Liaison Committee on Medical Education (LCME) (Not CHEA-recognized, USDE-recognized although not eligible for Title IV funding)
 Masters in Psychology and Counseling Accreditation Council (MPCAC) (CHEA-recognized, not USDE-recognized)
 Midwifery Education Accreditation Council (MEAC) (Not CHEA-recognized, USDE-recognized)
 Montessori Accreditation Council for Teacher Education (MACTE) (Not CHEA-recognized, USDE-recognized)
 National Accrediting Agency for Clinical Laboratory Sciences (NAACLS) (CHEA-recognized, not USDE-recognized)
 National Association for the Education of Young Children (NAEYC) (CHEA-recognized, not USDE-recognized)
 National Association of Schools of Art and Design Commission on Accreditation (NASAD) (Not CHEA-recognized, USDE-recognized)
 National Association of Schools of Dance Commission on Accreditation (NASD) (Not CHEA-recognized, USDE-recognized)
 National Association of Schools of Music Commission on Accreditation (NASM) (Not CHEA-recognized, USDE-recognized)
 National Association of Schools of Theatre Commission on Accreditation (NAST) (Not CHEA-recognized, USDE-recognized)
 National Council for Accreditation of Teacher Education (NCATE) (CHEA-recognized, USDE-recognized)
 Network of Schools of Public Policy, Affairs, and Administration, Commission on Peer Review and Accreditation (NASPAA-COPRA) (CHEA-recognized, not USDE-recognized)
 Planning Accreditation Board (PAB) (CHEA-recognized, not USDE-recognized)
 Psychological Clinical Science Accreditation System (PCSAS) (CHEA-recognized, not USDE-recognized)
 Teacher Education Accreditation Council (TEAC) (CHEA-recognized, USDE-recognized)

Vietnam 

 Vietnam National University of Hanoi - Center for Education Accreditation
 Vietnam National University of Ho Chi Minh City - Center for Education Accreditation
 Danang University - Center for Education Accreditation
 Vinh University - Center for Education Accreditation
 Association of Vietnam Universities and Colleges - Center for Education Accreditation

See also

 International Association of Universities
 List of unrecognized higher education accreditation organizations
 Central and East European Management Development Association

References

Academic institutions
Higher education accreditation
Accreditation Organizations, Recognized
Higher